The 2009–10 Colorado Buffaloes women's basketball team represented the University of Colorado in the 2009–10 NCAA Division I women's basketball season. The Buffaloes were members of the Big 12.

Offseason
 July 7: Bianca Smith played basketball with a group from USA Athletes International, an organization that gives amateur athletes the opportunity to participate on an international stage. Smith teamed up with the three former Central Michigan Chippewas – Sharonda Hurd, Latisha Luckett and Angel Chan as well as Prairie View A&M’s Gaati Werema, IPFW’s Jordan Zuppe, Cornell’s Lauren Benson, Breynna Winkler of Gardner-Webb and Vanderbilt’s Jence Rhoads. In all, three teams – two women’s, one men's – were part of the USAAI travel party. Six of the seven games were played in Vienna at the Pentecost Tournament. The team played two games a day, competing against teams from all over Europe.  After the three-day tournament, USAAI took a six-hour trip into the Czech Republic for a game there.
 July 21: University of Colorado sophomore forward Julie Seabrook will be playing for the Canada National Junior Team at the 2009 FIBA U19 World Championship for Women, to be contested July 23-August 2 in Bangkok, Thailand.

Freshmen
April 16: Kailah Bailey has signed a National Letter of Intent to play basketball at the University of Colorado in 2009-10. Bailey is a 6-0 power forward from Omaha, Nebraska, was listed as the 9th best available unsigned player for 2009 according to the Collegiate Girls Basketball Report. Bailey is the fifth player in CU’s Class of 2009, joining Janeesa “Chucky” Jeffery, a 5-10 guard from Colorado Springs (Sierra High School), Brenna Malcolm-Peck, a 6-2 forward from Boulder (Horizon), Meagan Malcolm-Peck, a 6-2 forward from Boulder (Horizon) and Melissa MacFarlane, a 6-7 center from Omaha (Millard North). The 2009 class includes three Colorado signees. This is the largest contingent from the state to come to CU since 1997.

Exhibition

Regular season

Roster

Schedule
The Buffaloes participated in the Minnesota Tournament held on November 21 and 22. In addition, the Buffaloes hosted the 23rd Annual Coors Classic from November 27 to 28.

Big 12 Tournament

Player stats

References

External links
Official Site

Colorado Buffaloes women's basketball seasons
Colorado
Colorado Buff
Colorado Buff